Kathy Jordan and Anne Smith were the defending champions but lost in the final 6–3, 6–1 against Jo Durie and Ann Kiyomura.

Seeds
Champion seeds are indicated in bold text while text in italics indicates the round in which those seeds were eliminated.

 Kathy Jordan /  Anne Smith (final)
 Claudia Kohde-Kilsch /  Eva Pfaff (semifinals)
 Rosemary Casals /  Virginia Ruzici (semifinals)
 Kathleen Horvath /  Yvonne Vermaak (first round)

Draw

External links
 1983 Virginia Slims of Boston Doubles Draw

Virginia Slims of Boston
1983 Virginia Slims World Championship Series
Virginia
Virginia